Eremaea dendroidea is a plant in the myrtle family, Myrtaceae and is endemic to the south-west of Western Australia. It is a small tree with small leaves and orange-coloured flowers on the ends of the branches in September. It has the most northerly distribution of all the eremaeas.

Description
Its branches point upwards from the main stem and the younger branches are densely covered with fine hairs. Sometimes there is a single vein visible on the lower surface.

The flowers are orange-coloured, on the ends of the long branches and occur singly or in pairs. The stamens, which give the flower its colour, are arranged in 5 bundles, each containing 46 to 49 stamens. Flowering occurs in September and is followed by fruits which are woody capsules. Unlike most others in the genus, the fruits of Eremaea dendroidea open and release the seeds when they are mature and are not retained in the fruit until the death of the plant.

Taxonomy and naming
Eremaea dendroidea was first formally described in 1993 by Roger Hnatiuk in Nuytsia. The specific epithet (dendroidea) is from the Ancient Greek δένδρον (déndron) meaning "a tree" and εἶδος (eîdos) meaning "form" or "likeness" referring to the tree like growth form of this species.

Distribution and habitat
Eremaea dendroidea is found in the northern part of the Irwin district, in the Carnarvon, Geraldton Sandplains and Yalgoo biogeographic regions. It grows in sandy soil on sand dunes, including near their crests.

Conservation
Eremaea dendroidea is classified as "not threatened" by the Western Australian Government Department of Parks and Wildlife.

References

dendroidea
Myrtales of Australia
Plants described in 1993
Endemic flora of Western Australia